The men's light bantamweight (51 kg/112.2 lbs) Low-Kick division at the W.A.K.O. European Championships 2004 in Budva was the lightest of the male Low-Kick tournaments and was one of the smallest involving just three fighters.  Each of the matches was three rounds of two minutes each and were fought under Low-Kick kickboxing rules.

As there was too few fighters for a tournament designed for four, one of the contestants received a bye through to the final.  The tournament gold medallist was Russia's Ivan Bityutskikh who defeated Maksim Tulai from Belarus by unanimous decision.  The bronze medal position went to the only other participant, Ante Juricev Sudac from Croatia.

Results

Key

See also
List of WAKO Amateur European Championships
List of WAKO Amateur World Championships
List of male kickboxers

References

External links
 WAKO World Association of Kickboxing Organizations Official Site

W.A.K.O. European Championships 2004 (Budva)